The 2007 SEC softball tournament was held at Jane B. Moore Field on the campus of Auburn University in Auburn, Alabama, from May 10 through May 12, 2007.  LSU won the tournament and earned the Southeastern Conference's automatic bid to the 2007 NCAA tournament.

Tournament

Kentucky, Auburn and Arkansas did not make the tournament.  Vanderbilt does not sponsor a softball team.
* Extra innings

All-Tournament Team
P - Stacey Nelson, Florida
P - Dani Hofer, LSU
C - McKenna Hughes, South Carolina
IF - Melissa Zick, Florida
IF - Shannon Stein, LSU
IF - Kellie Eubanks, Alabama
IF - Kim Waleszonia, Florida
OF - Lindsay Schutzler, Tennessee
OF - Rachel Mitchell, LSU
OF - Leslie Klein, LSU
DP - Tiffany Huff, Tennessee
SEC Tournament MVP: Dani Hofer, LSU

See also
Women's College World Series
NCAA Division I Softball Championship
2007 NCAA Division I softball tournament
SEC softball tournament
SEC Tournament

External links
2007 SEC softball tournament @ SECSports.com

References

SEC softball tournament
2007 Southeastern Conference softball season